This article documents the official results of the Men's Hammer Throw event at the 1999 World Championships in Seville, Spain. There were a total number of 39 participating athletes, with the final held on Sunday 22 August 1999.

Medalists

Schedule
All times are Central European Time (UTC+1)

Abbreviations
All results shown are in metres

Records

Qualification

Group A

Group B

Final

See also
 1996 Men's Olympic Hammer Throw (Atlanta)
 1998 Men's European Championships Hammer Throw (Budapest)
 1999 Hammer Throw Year Ranking
 2000 Men's Olympic Hammer Throw (Sydney)
 2002 Men's European Championships Hammer Throw (Munich)

References
 
 hammerthrow.wz
 trackandfieldnews

D
Hammer throw at the World Athletics Championships